Doctor Who Live: The Monsters Are Coming! is an arena stage show based on the BBC TV programme Doctor Who.

Plot
The live show is an implied sequel to the 1973 Doctor Who television episode Carnival of Monsters.  It centres around Vorgenson, the Greatest Showman in the Galaxy, who with the help of his incredible invention, 'The Minimiser', can make any Doctor Who character appear on stage as part of his travelling show dedicated to his hero. The show features Matt Smith as the Eleventh Doctor in pre-recorded video clips, with Nigel Planer as Vorgenson, The Inter-Galactic Showman. The show features numerous monsters from the show: the Judoon, Clockwork Robots, Silurians, Weeping Angels, Ood, Cybermen, Daleks, Scarecrows, Winders and Smilers.

After showing off the different monsters he has captured Vorgenson reveals that he plans to use his device to create a scenario in which the Doctor will believe that the audience is in peril, he does this by pulling Winston Churchill from World War II, causing a paradox and threatening the present. As Vorgenson leaves the stage, Churchill is able to take advantage of this moment by contacting the Doctor through a mobile phone, and the Doctor rushes on his way to save Winston and the audience. Once Vorgenson comes back, he manages to sends Winston back into the minimiser and then sends the Judoon into the audience to find the Doctor in case he has already arrived. The Judoon attempt to scan Voregenson (who is an alien) but he tricks them into thinking the Doctor is in the minimiser and they return to it. Vorgenson leaves. The Doctor contacts the audience and tells them that if he shouts "Geronimo!" at them they must shout it back as this will automatically bring the TARDIS to the Doctor. A beep on the TARDIS screen troubles the Doctor, who cautions the audience that a group of Weeping Angels have escaped from the minimiser. The Doctor warns them not to blink, and leaves. A weeping angel appears on the big screen in a neutral position, staying there for a few minutes. Suddenly, the audience is distracted by a group of policemen entering from the back of the theatre, informing the audience to stay in their seats, and revealing that they were alerted by an anonymous tipoff. The police walk onto the stage and are picked off one-by-one by two new angels that have appeared next to the screen. Vorgenson comes back onscreen and sends the angels back into the minimiser, joking that the police were collateral damage. The Doctor appears and tells Vorgenson that it is his last chance to shut down the minimiser, or he will do it himself. Vorgenson manages to trap the Doctor inside of the minimiser, and as he leaves the Doctor shouts that there is someone else behind these events, ending the first act.

Some of the scarecrows entertain the audience during the interval.

The second act starts immediately with the Cybermen being released into the audience, which features a sequence that a man is thrown into the minimiser and is "upgraded" into a Cyberman himself.  Afterwards, the Daleks appear, and they reveal that they were the ones that gave Vorgenson the concept for the minimiser by projecting the ideas into his dreams. They capture the Doctor, who was trapped in the Minimiser by Vorgenson in the first act, and imprison him inside of a box on the stage. From the box, The Doctor manages to send out Cybermen from the Minimiser, and they engage in battle with the Daleks. Though the Daleks have the upper hand at first, the Cybermen reveal that they have upgraded their own technology, which allows them to overpower the Daleks. Realising that they can't win, the Daleks all retreat into the minimiser, and it seems that their evil plan has been stopped once and for all. The Doctor escapes from the box, and Vorgenson comes to apologize to the Doctor for everything he's done. The Doctor reveals that he's released all of the monsters that Vorgenson had trapped, with the exception of the Daleks themselves, and then offers to send Vorgenson back to his own planet. Suddenly, it is revealed that one of the Daleks managed to sneak away during the confrontation, and it threatens the Doctor and the audience. The Doctor then calls on the audience to shout out "Geronimo" with him, which allows for the TARDIS to appear. It overpowers the lone Dalek, and it is sent far away. The show ends with the Doctor thanking the audience, and leaving in his TARDIS.

Conception and development
After the success of the first Doctor Who Prom, BBC Worldwide decided to develop a live Doctor Who concert tour. Around Christmas 2009, Worldwide approached Will Brenton, creator of Tweenies, to direct the show. Brenton, who had experience with large arena-based shows (including a Thomas the Tank Engine live experience), decided that the performance would need more narrative thrust and live engagement with the audience. In discussions with Doctor Who executive producer Steven Moffat, Brenton proposed a "Jurassic Park kind of feel, with this character who's reeling out these characters"; Moffat suggested that the show could follow on from elements of the 1973 Doctor Who television serial Carnival of Monsters, which featured an interstellar showman who kept different monsters miniaturised for entertainment. Doctor Who writer Gareth Roberts was brought on to co-write the show's script with Brenton. Ben Foster, who orchestrates Murray Gold's compositions for the television programme, developed the musical component of the show, and conducts the 16-piece band.

Tour
The show was performed in arenas in 9 UK cities in October and November 2010:

References

External links
 Doctor Who Live - official site

2010 plays
Cybermen stories
Dalek stories
Eleventh Doctor stories
Stage plays based on Doctor Who
2010 in the United Kingdom